Frank Mills Andrews (January 28, 1867 – September 3, 1948; aged 81) was an American architect born in Des Moines, Iowa, who practiced in Chicago, New York City, Cincinnati and Dayton. Andrews died in Brooklyn, New York.

Known for designing the Flemish façade outside of the Dayton Arcade. inspired by a guild hall in Amsterdam, it quickly became an architectural staple in Dayton's downtown. Also designed the large 90 ft. wide by 70 ft. tall dome on top of the marketplace building within the Arcade.

Biography
Andrews studied civil engineering at Iowa State College in Ames and architecture at Cornell University, where he was graduated with an A. B. degree in 1888.

The son of Lorenzo Frank Andrews and the former Sophia Maxwell Dolson, he was married in November 1894 to Gertrude Reynolds, with whom he had a daughter.  They were divorced in March 1909.  He then married actress Pauline Frederick in 1909; they had one daughter,Pauline(1910). In 1927, he was remarried to Ellen Brown, by whom he fathered a son and two daughters: Frank II, Doris, and Audrey.

He was a member of the Royal Society of Arts and appeared in Who's Who of America, and upon his death, the New York Times published an obituary for him.

Works
Among his commissions were:
Battle House Hotel, Mobile, Alabama
Kentucky State Capitol
Montana State Capitol wings
Battle Creek Sanitarium, Battle Creek, Michigan
National Cash Register plant, Dayton, Ohio
Hotel McAlpin, New York City
George Washington Hotel, New York City
Columbia Club, Indianapolis
Dayton Arcade, Dayton, Ohio
Conover Building, Dayton, Ohio
Claypool Hotel, Indianapolis

References

1867 births
1948 deaths
20th-century American architects
Artists from Des Moines, Iowa
Cornell University College of Architecture, Art, and Planning alumni